Centrinogyna is a genus of flower weevils in the beetle family Curculionidae. There are about six described species in Centrinogyna.

Species
These six species belong to the genus Centrinogyna:
 Centrinogyna canadensis Casey, 1920
 Centrinogyna hispidula Casey, 1920
 Centrinogyna laramiensis Casey, 1920
 Centrinogyna procera Casey, 1892
 Centrinogyna strigata (LeConte, 1876)
 Centrinogyna subaequalis Casey, 1920

References

Further reading

 
 
 

Baridinae
Articles created by Qbugbot